Season For Assault is the second album by New Zealand metal band 8 Foot Sativa. It was released in New Zealand on 14 July 2003 by Intergalactic Records. It was later released in Australia on 12 April 2004 by Roadrunner Records, and worldwide on 13 September 2004 by Black Mark Records. This album was the last album to feature vocalist Justin 'Jackhammer' Niessen, and the first to feature drummer Sam Sheppard.

Some copies of the album feature a hidden track of "Hate Made Me".

Track listing
 What's Lost Is Tomorrow  – 4:15
 Escape from Reality  – 4:54
 For Religions to Suffer  – 4:13
 Destined to Be Dead  – 3:47
 Hatred Forever  – 3:25
 Season for Assault  – 4:09
 Chelsea Smile  – 3:08
 The Abused  – 2:26
 Disorder  – 4:22
 Gutless  – 4:44

Bonus Track
 Hate Made Me - 3:14

Credits 
Justin 'Jackhammer' Neissen - vocals
Gary Smith - Guitar
Brent Fox - Bass guitar
Sam Sheppard - drums

Charts

References

2003 albums
8 Foot Sativa albums